Kanbedan (also Romanized as Kanbedān) is a village in Dodangeh Rural District, Hurand District, Ahar County, East Azerbaijan Province, Iran. At the 2006 census, its population was 109, in 24 families.

References 

Populated places in Ahar County